Pizzelle (singular pizzella) are traditional Italian waffle cookies made from flour, eggs, sugar, butter or vegetable oil, and flavoring (usually anise or anisette, less commonly vanilla or lemon zest).  Pizzelle can be hard and crisp or soft and chewy depending on the ingredients and method of preparation. It can be moulded into various shapes, including in the shape of cannoli.

Pizzelle were originally made in Ortona, in the Abruzzo region of Southern Italy.  The name shares an etymology with the Italian word pizza. Many other cultures have developed a pizzelle-type cookie as part of their culture (for example, the Norwegian Krumkake).  It is known to be one of the oldest cookies and is likely to have developed from the ancient Roman crustulum.

Pizzelle are also known as nevole in some parts of Abruzzo. Pizzelle are known as ferratelle in the Lazio region of Italy. In Molise they may be called ferratelle, cancelle, or pizzelle.

The cookie dough or batter is put into a pizzelle iron, which resembles a small variant of the popular waffle iron. Originally, the pizzelle iron was held by hand over a hot burner on the stovetop, although today most pizzelles are made using electric models and require no stove. Typically, the iron stamps a snowflake pattern onto both sides of the thin golden-brown cookie, which has a crisp texture once cooled.  There are also several brands of factory-made pizzelle available in stores.

Pizzelle are popular during Christmas and Easter. They are often found at Italian weddings, alongside other traditional pastries such as cannoli and traditional Italian cookies.

It is also common to sandwich two pizzelle with cannoli cream (ricotta blended with sugar) or hazelnut spread. Pizzelle, while still warm, can also be rolled using a wooden dowel to create cannoli shells.

References

References 
"Pizzelle Traditions." Chef's Choice. 15 Sept. 2006. Edgecraft Organization.  4 December 2006.
Stradley, Linda. "History of Cookies." What's Cooking America. 26 Sept. 2006.  4 December 2006.

Cookies
Italian pastries
Waffles
Christmas food
Easter food
Cuisine of Abruzzo
Cuisine of Molise
Italian desserts
Anise
Easter traditions in Italy